KKNN (95.1 FM "95 Rock FM") is a radio station serving Grand Junction, Colorado and vicinity with a mainstream rock format. This station is under ownership of Townsquare Media.

External links
95 Rock FM - Official website

Active rock radio stations in the United States
KNN
Radio stations established in 1976
1976 establishments in Colorado
Townsquare Media radio stations